Shri Digamber Jain Atishya Kshetra Mandir, Sanghiji is an ancient Jain Temple in Sanganer, Rajasthan made of red stone. The ancient Shri Digamber Jain temple of Sanganer is 16 km from Jaipur.

History 

This temple is a major Jain pilgimage center. The idol of the principal deity of this temple, Lord Rishabhanatha (Adinatha), the first Tirthankara, is supposed to be 4000 years old. The last phase of this temple was completed in the 10th century A.D., according to the inscription of V.S. 1011 in one of the Toranas.

About temple 

In the underground portion, there is located an ancient small temple guarded by the yaksha, nature spirits. The sacred temple has seven underground floors which are kept closed due to old religious beliefs and visitors are not allowed to see them. It is said that only a Balyati ascetic Digambara saint can enter it and can bring out the idols of this underground temple for a limited period, which is declared and decided previously.

The temple also has a dharamshala equipped with all modern facilities, including bhojanalaya (a restaurant).

Architecture

The Jaina temple follows Nagara architecture. The temple features a highly decorated arched entrance. The temple has a double storey gateway with first storey sumounted by an Nagara style arched Shikhara.

The temple features a sky-high shikharas and the inner sanctum is a stone shrine with eight sky-high shikharas (pinnacles). Sanghiji temple is considered a great specimen of Hindu and Jain architecture. The larger shrine was built using marble and sandstone in the 10th century and the smaller shrine is rich with ornate carvings of the temple; using the white marble is comparable to that of Dilwara Temples in Mount Abu.

The decorative features such as flying arches, bracket figures, carved pillars, and lotus ceilings are a feature of Māru-Gurjara architecture.

Idols

The inner temple has three pinnacles; in the centre is an idol of Parshwanath with seven serpent hoods. All around it is carvings of lotuses, creepers and elephants pouring water from pitchers held in their trunks. The main idol is that of Adinath, installed in the shrine behind this.

In 1999, Muni Sudhasagar visited the temple and brought thirty-nine valuable Jain idols. He claimed that he brought the idols from the fourth underground floor and encountered many yakshas (in the form of snakes) protecting the treasure.

Gallery

See also

 Padampura
 Chamatkarji

References

Citations

Sources

Books

Web 
  
 
 
 
 Indira Gandhi National Centre for the Arts
 
  
  

Jain temples in Rajasthan
Buildings and structures in Jaipur
10th-century Jain temples
Tourist attractions in Jaipur